Him or HIM may refer to:

Arts and entertainment

Film and television
 "Him" (Buffy the Vampire Slayer), a TV episode
 Him (film), a 1974 pornographic film 
 Him (The Powerpuff Girls), a villain in the TV series
 Him (Wonder Showzen character)
...Him, Captain Chaos, in The Cannonball Run
 How It's Made, a television program, Canada
 Him (TV series), a drama

Music
 HIM (Finnish band), a Finnish gothic rock band
 HiM (American band), an American post-rock group
 The Him, a Dutch DJ duo and electronic music production team
 Him (album), a 2006 album by Michael Sweet
 "Him" (Rupert Holmes song), a 1980 song
 "Him" (Sarah Brightman song), a 1983 song
 HIM International Music, a Taiwanese record label established in 1999
 "Him", a song by Lily Allen from It's Not Me, It's You
 "HIM", a song by Sam Smith from The Thrill of It All

Other uses in arts and entertainment
 Him (Cummings play), a 1927 play by E. E. Cummings
 Him (Walken play), a 1995 play about Elvis Presley written by Christopher Walken
 Him, an alternative name for Adam Warlock in the Marvel Comics universes
Him, a 2015 book by Sarina Bowen and Elle Kennedy, the first book in the series of the same name

Other uses
 Him, the objective form of the English-language pronoun he
 Health information management practice
 Hingurakgoda Airport (IATA code), an airport in Hingurakgoda, Sri Lanka
 His Imperial Majesty or Her Imperial Majesty, imperial styles
 Hot Ionized Medium, a component of the interstellar medium
 Guard Corps (Haganah), a pre-Israel Jewish paramilitary organization
 Molde University College (Høgskolen i Molde), Norway
 Scanning helium ion microscope, an imaging technology

See also
Hymn (disambiguation)

Conner = HIM